Ancient Greek cuisine was characterized by its frugality for most, reflecting agricultural hardship, but a great diversity of ingredients was known, and wealthy Greeks were known to celebrate with elaborate meals and feasts.

The cuisine was founded on the "Mediterranean triad" of cereals, olives, and grapes, which had many uses and great commercial value, but other ingredients were as important, if not more so, to the average diet: most notably legumes. Research suggests that the agricultural system of Ancient Greece could not have succeeded without the cultivation of legumes.

Modern knowledge of ancient Greek cuisine and eating habits is derived from textual, archeological, and artistic evidence.

Meals 

In the homeric epics of Iliad and Odyssey, three meals are mentioned.
 Ariston (ἄριστον)
 Dorpon (δόρπον) or Dorpos (δόρπος)
 Deipnon (δεῖπνον)

Ariston was the early meal, while dorpon was the late meal. Deipnon could be either, without reference to time.

In the later age Greeks had the below meals:
 Acratisma (ἀκράτισμα)
 Ariston
 Deipnon

Acratisma was the early meal (similar to the ariston of the homeric age), ariston was the middle meal and deipnon was the evening meal (similar to the dorpon of the homeric age).

Description of the meals

Breakfast
Breakfast ( akratismós and ἀκράτισμα akratisma, acratisma) consisted of barley bread dipped in wine ( ákratos), sometimes complemented by figs or olives. The earliest attested references on tagenias are in the works of the 5th century BC poets Cratinus and Magnes.

Tagenites were made with wheat flour, olive oil, honey and curdled milk, and were served for breakfast. Athenaeus in his Deipnosophistae mentions staititas topped with honey, sesame and cheese.

Lunch
A quick lunch ( áriston) was taken around noon or early afternoon.

Dinner
Dinner ( deīpnon), the most important meal of the day, was generally taken at nightfall. An additional light meal ( hespérisma) was sometimes taken in the late afternoon.  / aristódeipnon, literally "lunch-dinner", was served in the late afternoon instead of dinner.

Epideipnis (ἐπιδειπνίς) was a second course at dinner.

Eating customs
Men and women took their meals separately. When the house was small, the men ate first and the women afterwards. Respect for the father who was the breadwinner was obvious. Slaves waited at dinners. Aristotle notes that "the poor, having no slaves, would ask their wives or children to serve food."

The ancient Greek custom of placing terracotta miniatures of furniture in children's graves gives a good idea of its style and design. The Greeks normally ate while seated on chairs; benches were used for banquets. Tables - high for normal meals, low for banquets - were initially rectangular. By the 4th century BC, most tables were round, often with animal-shaped legs (for example lion's paws).

Loaves of flat bread were occasionally used as plates; terracotta bowls were more common. Dishes became more refined over time, and by the Roman period plates were sometimes made out of precious metals or glass. Cutlery was not often used at the table. Use of the fork was unknown; people ate with their fingers. Knives were used to cut the meat. Spoons were used for soups and broths. Pieces of bread ( apomagdalía) could be used to spoon the food or as napkins to wipe the fingers.

Social dining 

As with modern dinner parties, the host could simply invite friends or family; but two other forms of social dining were well documented in ancient Greece: the entertainment of the all-male symposium, and the obligatory, regimental syssitia.

Symposium 

The symposium ( sympósion), traditionally translated as "banquet", but more literally "gathering of drinkers", was one of the preferred pastimes for Greek men. It consisted of two parts: the first dedicated to food, generally rather simple, and a second part dedicated to drinking. However, wine was consumed with the food, and the beverages were accompanied by snacks ( tragēmata) such as chestnuts, beans, toasted wheat, or honey cakes, all intended to absorb alcohol and extend the drinking spree.

The second part was inaugurated with a libation, most often in honor of Dionysus, followed by conversation or table games, such as kottabos. The guests would recline on couches ( klínai); low tables held the food or game boards.

Dancers, acrobats, and musicians would entertain the wealthy banqueters. A "king of the banquet" was drawn by lots; he had to direct the slaves as to how strong to mix the wine.

With the exception of courtesans, the banquet was strictly reserved for men. It was an essential element of Greek social life. Great feasts could only be afforded by the rich; in most Greek homes, religious feasts or family events were the occasion of more modest banquets.

The banquet became the setting of a specific genre of literature, giving birth to Plato's Symposium, Xenophon's work of the same name, the Table Talk of Plutarch's Moralia, and the Deipnosophists (Banquet of the Learned) of Athenaeus.

Syssitia 

The syssitia ( tà syssítia) were mandatory meals shared by social or religious groups for men and youths, especially in Crete and Sparta. They were referred to variously as hetairia,  pheiditia, or andreia (literally, "belonging to men").

They served as both a kind of aristocratic club and as a military mess.  Like the symposium, the syssitia was the exclusive domain of men – although some references have been found to substantiate all-female syssitia.  Unlike the symposium, these meals were hallmarked by simplicity and temperance.

Ingredients and dishes

Grains

Breads and cakes

Cereals formed the staple diet. The two main grains were wheat ( sītos) and barley ( krithē).

When Greece was conquered by Rome during the 3rd century B.C., commercial bakeries were well known and spread. In fact Pliny the Elder suggests that the production of bread moved from the family to the “industrial” thanks to the work of skilled artisans (according to Pliny, starting from 171 BC). Plato favored home production over commercial production and in Gorgias, described Thearion the baker as an Athenian novelty who sells goods that could be made at home.

In ancient Greece, bread was served with accompaniments known as opson , sometimes rendered in English as "relish". This was a generic term which referred to anything which accompanied this staple food, whether meat or fish, fruit or vegetable.

Cakes may have been consumed for religious reasons as well as secular. Philoxenus of Cythera describes in detail some cakes that were eaten as part of an elaborate dinner using the traditional dithyrambic style used for sacred Dionysian hymns: "mixed with safflower, toasted, wheat-oat-white-chickpea-little thistle-little-sesame-honey-mouthful of everything, with a honey rim".

Athenaeus says the charisios was eaten at the "all-night festival", but John Wilkins notes that the distinction between the sacred and secular can be blurred in antiquity.

Ancient writers mention melitoutta, which was a honeycake.

Wheat 
Wheat grains were softened by soaking, then either reduced into gruel, or ground into flour ( aleíata) and kneaded and formed into loaves ( ártos) or flatbreads, either plain or mixed with cheese or honey. Leavening was known; the Greeks later used an alkali ( nítron) and wine yeast as leavening agents. Dough loaves were baked at home in a clay oven ( ipnós) set on legs.

Bread wheat, difficult to grow in Mediterranean climates, and the white bread made from it, were associated with the upper classes in the ancient Mediterranean, while the poor ate coarse brown breads made from emmer wheat and barley.

A simpler baking method involved placing lighted coals on the floor and covering the heap with a dome-shaped lid ( pnigeús); when it was hot enough, the coals were swept aside, and dough loaves were placed on the warm floor. The lid was then put back in place, and the coals were gathered on the side of the cover.

The stone oven did not appear until the Roman period. Solon, an Athenian lawmaker of the 6th century BC, prescribed that leavened bread be reserved for feast days. By the end of the 5th century BC, leavened bread was sold at the market, though it was expensive.

Barley 
Barley was easier to grow than wheat, but more difficult to make bread from. Barley-based breads were nourishing but very heavy. Because of this, it was often roasted before being milled into coarse flour ( álphita). Barley flour was used to make  maza, the basic Greek dish. Maza could be served cooked or raw, as a broth, or made into dumplings or flatbreads. Like wheat breads, it could also be augmented with cheese or honey.

In Peace, Aristophanes employs the expression , literally "to eat only barley", with a meaning equivalent to the English "diet of bread and water".

Millet
Millet was growing wild in Greece as early as 3000 BCE, and bulk storage containers for millet have been found from the Late Bronze Age in Macedonia and northern Greece. Hesiod describes that "the beards grow round the millet, which men sow in summer."

Millet is listed along with wheat in the 3rd century BCE by Theophrastus in his "Enquiry into Plants"

Emmer
Black bread, made from emmer (sometimes called "emmer wheat"), was cheaper (and easier to make) than wheat; it was associated with the lower classes and the poor.

Legumes
Legumes were essential to the Greek diet, and were harvested in the Mediterranean region from prehistoric times: the earliest and most common being lentils - which have been found in archeological sites in Greece dating to the Upper Paleolithic period. As one of the first domesticated crops to be introduced to Greece, lentils are commonly found at regional archaeological sites from the Upper Paleolithic.

Lentils and chickpeas are the most frequently mentioned legumes in classical literature.
Bitter vetch – This plant was present in Greece from at least 8000 BCE, and was occasionally eaten in Classical times. Most ancient literature that mentions it describes it as animal food and having a disagreeable taste. Several classical authors suggest medicinal uses for it.
Black beans – Homer mentions the threshing a black bean (not black turtle beans) as a metaphor in the Iliad
Broad beans – Broad, or Fava Beans are rare in archeological sites, but are common in classical literature. They were eaten both as main dishes and also included in desserts (mixed with figs). In addition to describing them as food, classical authors attribute various medicinal qualities to the beans.
Chickpeas – Chickpeas are mentioned almost as frequently in classical literature as lentils (by Aristophanes and Theophrastus among others), but are found rarely in archeological sites in Greece. As they are found in prehistoric sites in the Middle East and India, it is likely their use was a late addition to the Ancient Greek diet
Grass peas – Like bitter vetch, grass peas were grown in ancient Greece mainly for animal fodder, however they were occasionally eaten in times of famine 
Lentils – Theophrastus states that "of the leguminous plants, the lentil is the most prolific"
Lupin bean – Lupin (or Lupine, Lupini) beans were present in the Mediterranean region from prehistoric times and were cultivated in Egypt by at least 2000 bce. By classical times, the Greeks were using them for both food and animal fodder.
Garden peas – Peas are commonly found in some of the earliest archaeological sites in Greece, but are rarely mentioned in classical literature. However Hesiod and Theophrastus both include them as food eaten by Greeks

Fruit and vegetables 
In ancient Greece, fruit and vegetables were a significant part of the diet, as the ancient Greeks consumed much less meat than in the typical diet of modern societies. Legumes would have been important crops, as their ability to replenish exhausted soil was known at least by the time of Xenophon.

Hesiod (7th-8th century BCE) describes many crops eaten by the ancient Greeks, among these are artichokes and peas.

Vegetables were eaten as soups, boiled or mashed ( etnos), seasoned with olive oil, vinegar, herbs or  gáron, a fish sauce similar to Vietnamese nước mắm. In the comedies of Aristophanes, Heracles was portrayed as a glutton with a fondness for mashed beans. Poor families ate oak acorns ( balanoi). Olives were a common appetizer.

In the cities, fresh vegetables were expensive, and therefore, the poorer city dwellers had to make do with dried vegetables. Lentil soup ( phakē) was the workman's typical dish. Cheese, garlic, and onions were the soldier's traditional fare. In Aristophanes' Peace, the smell of onions typically represents soldiers; the chorus, celebrating the end of war, sings Oh! joy, joy! No more helmet, no more cheese nor onions! Bitter vetch ( orobos) was considered a famine food.

Fruits, fresh or dried, and nuts, were eaten as dessert. Important fruits were figs, raisins, and pomegranates. In Athenaeus' Deipnosophistae, he describes a dessert made of figs and broad beans. Dried figs were also eaten as an appetizer or when drinking wine. In the latter case, they were often accompanied by grilled chestnuts, chick peas, and beechnuts.

Animals

Meat 

In the 8th century BC Hesiod describes the ideal country feast in Works and Days:

Meat is much less prominent in texts of the 5th century BC onwards than in the earliest poetry, but this may be a matter of genre rather than real evidence of changes in farming and food customs. Fresh meat was most commonly eaten at sacrifices, though sausage was much more common, consumed by people across the economic spectrum. In addition to the flesh of animals, the ancient Greeks often ate inner organs, many of which were considered delicacies such as paunches and tripe.
  

Hippolochus (3rd Century BCE) describes a wedding banquet in Macedonia with "chickens and ducks, and ringdoves, too, and a goose, and an abundance of suchlike viands piled high... following which came a second platter of silver, on which again lay a huge loaf, and geese, hares, young goats, and curiously moulded cakes besides, pigeons, turtle-doves, partridges, and other fowl in plenty..." and "a roast pig — a big one, too — which lay on its back upon it; the belly, seen from above, disclosed that it was full of many bounties. For, roasted inside it, were thrushes, ducks, and warblers in unlimited number, pease purée poured over eggs, oysters, and scallops"

Spartans primarily ate a soup made from pigs' legs and blood, known as melas zōmos, which means "black soup". According to Plutarch, it was "so much valued that the elderly men fed only upon that, leaving what flesh there was to the younger". It was famous amongst the Greeks. "Naturally Spartans are the bravest men in the world," joked a Sybarite, "anyone in his senses would rather die ten thousand times than take his share of such a sorry diet". It was made with pork, salt, vinegar and blood. The dish was served with maza, figs and cheese sometimes supplemented with game and fish. The 2nd–3rd century author Aelian claims that Spartan cooks were prohibited from cooking anything other than meat.

The consumption of fish and meat varied in accordance with the wealth and location of the household; in the country, hunting (primarily trapping) allowed for consumption of birds and hares. Peasants also had farmyards to provide them with chickens and geese. Slightly wealthier landowners could raise goats, pigs, or sheep. In the city, meat was expensive except for pork. In Aristophanes' day a piglet cost three drachmas, which was three days' wages for a public servant. Sausages were common both for the poor and the rich.  Archaeological excavations at Kavousi Kastro, Lerna, and Kastanas have shown that dogs were sometimes consumed in Bronze Age Greece, in addition to the more commonly-consumed pigs, cattle, sheep, and goats.

Fish 

Herodotus describes a "large fish... of the sort called Antacaei, without any prickly bones, and good for pickling," probably beluga found in Greek colonies along the Dnieper River. Other ancient writers mention skipjack tuna (pelamys); tuna (thynnoi); swordfish (xifiai); sea raven (korakinoi); black carp (melanes kyprinoi), porpoise (phykaina), and mackerel (scomber).

In the Greek islands and on the coast, fresh fish and seafood (squid, octopus, and shellfish) were common. They were eaten locally but more often transported inland. Sardines and anchovies were regular fare for the citizens of Athens. They were sometimes sold fresh, but more frequently salted. A stele of the late 3rd century BC from the small Boeotian city of Akraiphia, on Lake Copais, provides us with a list of fish prices. The cheapest was skaren (probably parrotfish) whereas Atlantic bluefin tuna was three times as expensive. Common salt water fish were yellowfin tuna, red mullet, ray, swordfish or sturgeon, a delicacy which was eaten salted. Lake Copais itself was famous in all Greece for its eels, celebrated by the hero of The Acharnians. Other fresh water fish were pike-fish, carp and the less appreciated catfish. In classical Athens, eels, conger-eels, and sea-perch were considered to be great delicacies, while sprats were cheap and readily available.

Fowl
Ancient Greeks consumed a much wider variety of birds than is typical today. Pheasants were present as early as 2000 BCE. Domestic chickens were brought to Greece from Asia Minor as early as 600 BCE, and domesticated geese are described in The Odyssey (800 BCE).  Quail, moorhen, capon, mallards, pheasants, larks, pigeons and doves were all domesticated in classical times, and were even for sale in markets. Additionally, thrush, blackbirds, chaffinch, lark, starling, jay, jackdaw, sparrow, siskin, blackcap, Rock partridge, grebe, plover, coot, wagtail, francolin, and even cranes were hunted, or trapped, and eaten, and sometimes available in markets.

Eggs and dairy products

Eggs
Greeks bred quails and hens, partly for their eggs. Some authors also praise pheasant eggs and Egyptian goose eggs, which were presumably rather rare. Eggs were cooked soft- or hard-boiled as hors d'œuvre or dessert. Whites, yolks and whole eggs were also used as ingredients in the preparation of dishes.

Milk
Hesiod describes "milk cake, and milk of goats drained dry" in his Works and Days. Country dwellers drank milk ( gala), but it was seldom used in cooking.

Butter
Butter ( bouturon) was known but seldom used: Greeks saw it as a  culinary trait of the Thracians of the northern Aegean coast, whom the Middle Comic poet Anaxandrides dubbed "butter eaters".

Cheese and yogurt
Cheesemaking was widespread by the 8th Century BCE, as the technical vocabulary associated with it is included in The Odyssey.

Greeks enjoyed other dairy products.  pyriatē and Oxygala were curdled milk products, similar to cottage cheese or perhaps to yogurt. Most of all, goat's and ewe's cheese ( tyros) was a staple food. Fresh cheeses (sometimes wrapped in Drakontion leaves to retain freshness) and hard cheeses were sold in different shops; the former cost about two thirds of the latter's price.

Cheese was eaten alone or with honey or vegetables. It was also used as an ingredient in the preparation of many dishes, including fish dishes (see recipe below by Mithaecus). However, the addition of cheese seems to have been a controversial matter; Archestratus warns his readers that Syracusan cooks spoil good fish by adding cheese.

Spices and seasonings
The first spice mentioned in Ancient Greek writings is cassia: Sappho (6th-7th Century BCE) mentions it in her poem on the marriage of Hector and Andromache. The ancient Greeks made a distinction between Ceylon cinnamon and cassia.

Ancient Greeks used at least two forms of pepper in cooking and medicine: one of Aristotle's students, Theophrastus, in describing the plants that appeared in Greece as a result of Alexander's conquest of India and Asia Minor,
listed both black pepper and long pepper, stating "one is round like bitter vetch...: the other is elongated and black and has seeds like those of a poppy : and this kind is much stronger than the other. Both however are heating...".

Theophrastus lists several plants in his book as "pot herbs" including dill, coriander, anise, cumin, fennel, rue, celery and celery seed.

Recipes
Homer describes the preparation of a wine and cheese drink: taking "Pramnian wine she grated goat's milk cheese into it with a bronze grater [and] threw in a handful of white barley meal." (Book 11 of the Iliad)

One fragment survives of the first known cookbook in any culture, it was written by Mithaecus (5th Century BCE) and is quoted in the "Deipnosophistae" of Athenaeus. It is a recipe for a fish called "tainia" (meaning "ribbon" in Ancient Greek - probably the species Cepola macrophthalma), 
"Tainia": gut, discard the head, rinse, slice; add cheese and [olive] oil.

Archestratus (4th Century BCE), the self-titled "inventor of made dishes," describes a recipe for paunch and tripe, cooked in "cumin juice, and vinegar and sharp, strong-smelling silphium".

Drink 

The most widespread drink was water. Fetching water was a daily task for women. Though wells were common, spring water was preferred: it was recognized as nutritious because it caused plants and trees to grow, and also as a desirable beverage. Pindar called spring water "as agreeable as honey".

The Greeks would describe water as robust, heavy or light, dry, acidic, pungent, wine-like, etc. One of the comic poet Antiphanes's characters claimed that he could recognize Attic water by taste alone. Athenaeus states that a number of philosophers had a reputation for drinking nothing but water, a habit combined with a vegetarian diet (see below). Milk, usually goats' milk, was not widely consumed, being considered barbaric.

The usual drinking vessel was the skyphos, made out of wood, terra cotta, or metal. Critias also mentions the kothon, a Spartan goblet which had the military advantage of hiding the colour of the water from view and trapping mud in its edge. The ancient Greeks also used a vessel called a kylix (a shallow footed bowl), and for banquets the kantharos (a deep cup with handles) or the rhyton, a drinking horn often moulded into the form of a human or animal head.

Wine 

The Greeks are thought to have made red as well as rosé and white wines. Like today, these varied in quality from common table wine to valuable vintages. It was generally considered that the best wines came from Thásos, Lesbos and Chios.

Cretan wine came to prominence later. A secondary wine made from water and pomace (the residue from squeezed grapes), mixed with lees, was made by country people for their own use. The Greeks sometimes sweetened their wine with honey and made medicinal wines by adding thyme, pennyroyal and other herbs. By the first century, if not before, they were familiar with wine flavoured with pine resin (modern retsina). Aelian also mentions a wine mixed with perfume. Cooked wine was known, as well as a sweet wine from Thásos, similar to port wine.

Wine was generally cut with water. The drinking of akraton or "unmixed wine", though known to be practised by northern barbarians, was thought likely to lead to madness and death. Wine was mixed in a krater, from which the slaves would fill the drinker's kylix with an oinochoe (jugs). Wine was also thought to have medicinal powers. Aelian mentions that the wine from Heraia in Arcadia rendered men foolish but women fertile; conversely, Achaean wine was thought to induce abortion.

Outside of these therapeutic uses, Greek society did not approve of women drinking wine. According to Aelian, a Massalian law prohibited this and restricted women to drinking water. Sparta was the only city where women routinely drank wine.

Wine reserved for local use was kept in skins. That destined for sale was poured into  pithoi, (large terra cotta jugs). From there they were decanted into amphoras sealed with pitch for retail sale. Vintage wines carried stamps from the producers or city magistrates who guaranteed their origin. This is one of the first instances of indicating the geographical or qualitative provenance of a product.

Kykeon 

The Greeks also drank kykeon (from  kykaō, "to shake, to mix"), which was both a beverage and a meal. It was a barley gruel, to which water and herbs were added. In the Iliad, the beverage also contained grated goat cheese. In the Odyssey, Circe adds honey and a magic potion to it. In the Homeric Hymn to Demeter, the goddess refuses red wine but accepts a kykeon made of water, flour, and pennyroyal.

Used as a ritual beverage in the Eleusinian Mysteries, kykeon was also a popular beverage, especially in the countryside: Theophrastus, in his Characters, describes a boorish peasant as having drunk much kykeon and inconveniencing the Assembly with his bad breath. It also had a reputation as a good digestive, and as such, in Peace, Hermes recommends it to the main character who has eaten too much dried fruit.

Ancient writers 
Timachidas the Rhodian wrote 11 books with dinner recipes. Noumenios, Matreas the Pitanean, Hegemon the Thasian, who was called Lentil-soup, Artemidoros, who was called the Pseudoaristophanean, and Philoxenos, son of Leukadios, wrote cookbooks.

In addition, some flat-cakes took their names from Philoxenos and were called Philoxenean (Φιλοξένειοι πλακοῦντες).

Zopyrinus (Ζωπύρινος) was an author of a work on cookery.

Cultural beliefs about the role of food 
Food played an important part in the Greek mode of thought. Classicist John Wilkins notes that "in the Odyssey for example, good men are distinguished from bad and Greeks from foreigners partly in terms of how and what they ate. Herodotus identified people partly in terms of food and eating".

Up to the 3rd century BC, the frugality imposed by the physical and climatic conditions of the country was held as virtuous. The Greeks did not ignore the pleasures of eating, but valued simplicity. The rural writer Hesiod, as cited above, spoke of his "flesh of a heifer fed in the woods, that has never calved, and of firstling kids" as being the perfect closing to a day. Nonetheless, Chrysippus is quoted as saying that the best meal was a free one.

Culinary and gastronomical research was rejected as a sign of oriental flabbiness: the inhabitants of the Persian Empire were considered decadent due to their luxurious taste, which manifested itself in their cuisine. The Greek authors took pleasure in describing the table of the Achaemenid Great King and his court: Herodotus, Clearchus of Soli, Strabo and Ctesias were unanimous in their descriptions.

In contrast, Greeks as a whole stressed the austerity of their own diet. Plutarch tells how the king of Pontus, eager to try the Spartan "black gruel", bought a  Laconian cook; 'but had no sooner tasted it than he found it extremely bad, which the cook observing, told him, "Sir, to make this broth relish, you should have bathed yourself first in the river Eurotas"'. According to Polyaenus, on discovering the dining hall of the Persian royal palace, Alexander the Great mocked their taste and blamed it for their defeat. Pausanias, on discovering the dining habits of the Persian commander Mardonius, equally ridiculed the Persians, "who having so much, came to rob the Greeks of their miserable living".

In consequence of this cult of frugality, and the diminished regard for cuisine it inspired, the kitchen long remained the domain of women, free or enslaved. In the classical period, however, culinary specialists began to enter the written record. Both Aelian and Athenaeus mention the thousand cooks who accompanied Smindyride of Sybaris on his voyage to Athens at the time of Cleisthenes, if only disapprovingly. Plato in Gorgias, mentions "Thearion the cook, Mithaecus the author of a treatise on Sicilian cooking, and Sarambos the wine merchant; three eminent connoisseurs of cake, kitchen and wine." Some chefs also wrote treatises on cuisine.

Over time, more and more Greeks presented themselves as gourmets. From the  Hellenistic to the Roman period, the Greeks — at least the rich — no longer appeared to be any more austere than others. The cultivated guests of the feast hosted by Athenaeus in the 2nd or 3rd century devoted a large part of their conversation to wine and gastronomy. They discussed the merits of various wines, vegetables, and meats, mentioning renowned dishes (stuffed cuttlefish, red tuna belly, prawns, lettuce watered with mead) and great cooks such as Soterides, chef to king Nicomedes I of Bithynia (who reigned from the 279 to 250 BC). When his master was inland, he pined for anchovies; Soterides simulated them from carefully carved turnips, oiled, salted and sprinkled with poppy seeds. Suidas (an encyclopaedia from the Byzantine period) mistakenly attributes this exploit to the celebrated Roman gourmet Apicius (1st century BC) —  which may be taken as evidence that the Greeks had reached the same level as the Romans.

Specific diets

Vegetarianism 

Orphicism and Pythagoreanism, two common ancient Greek religions, suggested a different way of life, based on a concept of purity and thus purification ( katharsis) — a form of asceticism in the original sense:  askēsis initially signifies a ritual, then a specific way of life. Vegetarianism was a central element of Orphicism and of several variants of Pythagoreanism.

Empedocles (5th century BC) justified vegetarianism by a belief in the transmigration of souls: who could guarantee that an animal about to be slaughtered did not house the soul of a human being? However, it can be observed that Empedocles also included plants in this transmigration, thus the same logic should have applied to eating them. Vegetarianism was also a consequence of a dislike for killing: "For Orpheus taught us rights and to refrain from killing".

The information from Pythagoras (6th century BC) is more difficult to define. The Comedic authors such as Aristophanes and Alexis described Pythagoreans as strictly vegetarian, with some of them living on bread and water alone. Other traditions contented themselves with prohibiting the consumption of certain vegetables, such as the broad bean, or of sacred animals such as the white cock or selected animal parts.

It follows that vegetarianism and the idea of ascetic purity were closely associated, and often accompanied by sexual abstinence. In On the eating of flesh, Plutarch (1st–2nd century) elaborated on the barbarism of blood-spilling; inverting the usual terms of debate, he asked the meat-eater to justify his choice.

The Neoplatonic Porphyrius (3rd century) associates in On Abstinence vegetarianism with the  Cretan mystery cults, and gives a census of past vegetarians, starting with the semi-mythical Epimenides. For him, the origin of vegetarianism was Demeter's gift of wheat to Triptolemus so that he could teach agriculture to humanity.  His three commandments were: "Honour your parents", "Honour the gods with fruit", and "Spare the animals".

Athlete diets 
Aelian claims that the first athlete to submit to a formal diet was Ikkos of Tarentum, a victor in the Olympic pentathlon (perhaps in 444 BC). However, Olympic wrestling champion (62nd through 66th Olympiads) Milo of Croton was already said to eat twenty pounds of meat and twenty pounds of bread and to drink eight quarts of wine each day. Before his time, athletes were said to practice  xērophagía (from  xēros, "dry"), a diet based on dry foods such as dried figs, fresh cheese and bread. Pythagoras (either the philosopher or a gymnastics master of the same name) was the first to direct athletes to eat meat.

Trainers later enforced some standard diet rules: to be an Olympic victor,  "you have to eat according to regulations, keep away from desserts (…); you must not drink cold water nor can you have a drink of wine whenever you want". It seems this diet was primarily based on meat, for Galen (ca. 180 AD) accused athletes of his day of "always gorging themselves on flesh and blood". Pausanias also refers to a "meat diet".

See also

 Byzantine cuisine
 Greek cuisine
 List of ancient dishes
 Nutrition in Classical Antiquity

References

Works cited 
 Briant, P. Histoire de l'Empire perse de Cyrus à Alexandre. Paris: Fayard, 1996. , translated in English as From Cyrus to Alexander: A History of the Persian Empire. Winona Lake, Ind.: Eisenbrauns, 2002 
 Dalby, A. Siren Feasts: A History of Food and Gastronomy in Greece. London: Routledge, 1996. 
  
 Dodds, E.R. "The Greek Shamans and the Origins of Puritanism ", The Greek and the Irrational (Sather Classical Lectures). Berkeley: University of California Press, 1962 (1st edn 1959).
 Flacelière R. La Vie quotidienne en Grèce au temps de Périclès. Paris: Hachette, 1988 (1st edn. 1959) , translated in English as Daily Life in Greece at the Time of Pericles. London: Phoenix Press, 2002 
 
 Migeotte, L., L'Économie des cités grecques. Paris: Ellipses, 2002  (in French)
 
 
 Wilkins, J., Harvey, D. and Dobson, M. Food in Antiquity. Exeter: University of Exeter Press, 1995.

Further reading 

  Amouretti, M.-Cl. Le Pain et l'huile dans la Grèce antique. De l'araire au moulin. Paris: Belles Lettres, 1989.
  Delatte, A. Le Cycéon, breuvage rituel des mystères d'Éleusis. Paris: Belles Lettres, 1955.
 Detienne, M. and Vernant, J.-P. (trans. Wissing, P.). The Cuisine of Sacrifice Among the Greeks. Chicago: The University of Chicago Press, 1989 (1st edn. 1979) 
 Davidson, James. Courtesans and Fishcakes: The Consuming Passions of Classical Athens. Fontana Press. 1998.

External links 
  "Végétarisme, au commencement…" (French language article on the origins of vegetarianism)
 A Taste of the Ancient World (University of Michigan)
 Ancient Greek Recipes and posts about Ancient Greek Cuisine

 
Greek
Greek cuisine
Ancient Greece